Bendiganahalli Narayangowda Bache Gowda (born 1 October 1942) is an Indian politician who is the current Member of Parliament in the (2019–present)  Lok Sabha from Chikkaballapur, and a member of the Bharatiya Janata Party.

B. N. Bache Gowda started his political career with Janata Party and was part of Deve Gowda group, whose Janata Dal (United) he joined in 1999. But he joined BJP later and contested elections as a member of BJP since 2008. He was elected to Karnataka Vidhan Sabha five times - in 1978, 1985, 1994, 1999, 2008 - from Hosakote (Vidhana Sabha constituency). He was the losing candidate in Hosakote in 1989, 2004, 2013. He was a minister in Jagadish Shettar's BJP government in 2013 but lost the assembly election that year from Hosakote. He contested Lok Sabha election from Chikkaballapur as BJP candidate in 2014 but lost. He won that seat in 2019.

His son Sharath Bachegowda (b 1982) contested from Hosakote as BJP candidate in 2018 but lost to Nagaraj of Congress. Nagaraj resigned from Congress in 2019 when Kumaraswamy ministry was toppled. Nagaraj contested the by-poll from Hosakote on BJP's ticket. Sharath Bache Gowda contested as a rebel, and defeated Nagaraj in the by-poll. Later Sharath Bachegowda joined Congress.

References

External links
 Official biographical sketch in Parliament of India website

India MPs 2019–present
Lok Sabha members from Karnataka
Living people
Bharatiya Janata Party politicians from Karnataka
People from Chikkaballapur
1942 births